Sternocostal ligament may refer to:

 Interarticular sternocostal ligament
 Radiate sternocostal ligaments